Greencastle is an unincorporated community in Kanawha County, West Virginia, United States. It is located at an elevation of 850 feet (259 m).

References

Unincorporated communities in Kanawha County, West Virginia
Unincorporated communities in West Virginia